The National Football League Comeback Player of the Year Award refers to a number of awards that are given to a National Football League (NFL) player who has shown perseverance in overcoming adversity, in the form of not being in the NFL the previous year, a severe injury, or simply poor performance. The awards have been presented by several organizations, including the Associated Press (AP), Pro Football Writers Association (PFWA), Sporting News, and United Press International (UPI). As of the 2022 season, Chad Pennington has been the only recipient of the award to have won the Associated Press NFL Comeback Player of the Year Award in multiple seasons.

AP Comeback Player of the Year award (1963–1966, 1998–present)

From 1963 to 1966, the award was given to both an NFL and AFL player. No award was given between 1966 and 1998. In recent years, reigning award recipients Andrew Luck and Alex Smith have retired before the upcoming season.

PFW/PFWA Comeback Player of the Year award (1972–present)
From 1972 to 1991, the Comeback Player of the Year award was presented by Pro Football Weekly (PFW) only. PFW and the Professional Football Writers of America (PFWA) combined their awards from 1992–2012.

UPI Comeback Player of the Year award (1962–1969)
In 1962, United Press International (UPI) chose a comeback player for the first time. The winner, Frank Gifford, had made a comeback from a devastating injury from a hit by Chuck Bednarik. The following year, the Associated Press (AP) established a similar award. UPI discontinued the award after 1963, with the exception of 1969. The AP did not give out the award from 1967 to 1998, when the award was reinstituted and given to Doug Flutie.

1962 Frank Gifford, WR, New York Giants
1963 Ed Brown, QB, Pittsburgh Steelers
1964–1968 No award given
1969 Gale Sayers, RB, Chicago Bears

Sporting News NFL Comeback Player of the Year award
 2008 — Antonio Bryant, WR, Tampa Bay Buccaneers
 2009 — Vince Young, QB, Tennessee Titans
 2010 — Michael Vick, QB, Philadelphia Eagles
 2011 — Plaxico Burress, WR, New York Jets
 2012 — Adrian Peterson, RB, Minnesota Vikings
 2013 — Darrelle Revis, CB, Tampa Bay Buccaneers
 2014 — Rob Gronkowski, TE, New England Patriots
 2015 — Carson Palmer, QB, Arizona Cardinals
 2016 — Jordy Nelson, WR, Green Bay Packers
2017 — Keenan Allen, WR, Los Angeles Chargers
2018 — Andrew Luck, QB, Indianapolis Colts
 2019 — Jimmy Garoppolo, QB, San Francisco 49ers
2020 — Alex Smith, QB, Washington Football Team
2021 — Joe Burrow, QB, Cincinnati Bengals
2022 — Geno Smith, QB, Seattle Seahawks

See also
 List of National Football League awards

References 

General

Specific

National Football League trophies and awards